The Dual Fluid Reactor (DFR) is a reactor concept of the Canadian company Dual Fluid Energy Inc. combining the advantages of the molten salt reactor with those of the liquid metal cooled reactor, it is supposed to reach the criteria for reactors of the Generation IV International Forum. The fuel can be a molten solution of actinide chloride salts, or it can be pure liquid actinide metal. The cooling is provided by molten lead in a separate loop. As a fast breeder reactor, the DFR can  use both natural uranium and thorium to breed fissile material, as well as recycle processed High-level waste and plutonium. Due to the high thermal conductivity of the molten metal, the Dual Fluid Reactor is an inherently safe reactor (the decay heat can be removed passively).

If the reactor works as intended, the U-238 of a spent nuclear fuel element of a LWR (about 1 ton) could be completely dissolved in Cl-salt, including the problematic long-living transuranic parts. Complete breeding and fission could power a 1 GW thermal Dual Fluid Reactor for about 2.5 years. After that time, the element would be completely converted into fission products and the need for storage in a final deposition for nuclear waste would be reduced from 1 million to about 300 years.

History 
  
The reactor was initially developed by a private German research institute, the Institute for Solid-State Nuclear Physics in Berlin. In February 2021, the six inventors, along with the existing team, formed the Canadian company Dual Fluid Energy Inc. to bring the design to commercial maturity. In June 2021, the company acquired over $6 million in Canadian seed funding.

To date, one patent has been obtained on the operating principle of the reactor, and another is pending on the liquid metal fuel variant  that the company is aiming for the first realization.

The reactor design won the public vote for the Galileo Knowledge Prize in the German GreenTec Awards of 2013, but the award committee presiding over the awards changed the rules to exclude all nuclear designs before announcing the winner. The Dual Fluid participants successfully sued in response to this.

A conceptual predecessor of the Dual Fluid Reactor was the UK 1970s lead-cooled fast spectrum MSR (MSFR), which was undergoing a design path inclusive of the fissile fuel likewise dissolved in a molten chloride salt, with experimental work undertaken over 1968-73. Funding ceased in 1974.

Trivia
The company Dual Fluid Energy Inc. no longer uses the previously used acronym "DFR" because of confusion with the Deounreay Fast Reactor.

References

Further reading 
 A new concept for a nuclear reactor. Triumf lectures, Hussein 2014
 Analysis and Evaluation of the Dual Fluid Reactor Concept, TU Munich
 Determination of the liquid eutectic metal fuel dual fluid reactor (DFRm) design – steady state calculations, 2019-04-04

External links 
Dual Fluid Reactor

Liquid metal fast reactors
Nuclear power reactor types